Multipurpose prevention technologies (MPTs) are a class of products that deliver varied combinations of HIV prevention, other sexually transmitted infection (STI) prevention, and contraception. MPTs can combine contraception and HIV prevention, contraception and other STI prevention, or the prevention of multiple STIs.

Types 
A range of MPT products are in development. The development pipeline includes different designs, product types, and configurations.
 Condoms (male and female) are the only MPT products currently available.
 Diaphragm with added microbicide
 Intravaginal ring (IVR)
 Gel (rectal or vaginal)
 Other vaginally administered products, including tablets (i.e., inserts), films, and patches

History 
The MPT field emerged from the microbicide field, a natural extension from the microbicide field’s focus on women-controlled methods to prevent HIV acquisition. In 2009, CAMI Health convened a multidisciplinary international meeting in Berkeley, California to formalize the MPT field. In 2011, the first major funding opportunity for MPT development was released by the National Institutes of Health.

References 

Contraception for males